Copăceni may refer to the following places:

Romania
 Copăceni, Ilfov, a commune in Ilfov County
 Copăceni, Vâlcea, a commune in Vâlcea County
 Copăceni, a village in Sâmbăta Commune, Bihor County
 Copăceni, a village in Săndulești Commune, Cluj County
 Copăceni, a village in Malu cu Flori Commune, Dâmboviţa County
 Copăceni, a village in Racovița, Vâlcea Commune, Vâlcea County

Moldova
 Copăceni, Sîngerei, a commune in Sîngerei District

See also 
 Copăcioasa (disambiguation)
 Copăcel, name of two villages in Romania
 Copăcele, a village in Caraș-Severin County
 Copăcești, a village in Vrancea County
 Copăceana, a village in Vaslui County
 Copăceanca, a village in Teleorman County